When I Loved You may refer to:
When I Loved You (Emily Osment EP) (2019)
"When I Loved You", a 1960 song by the Louvin Brothers from My Baby's Gone

See also
"Quand je t'aime" or "When I Love You", a 1987 song by Demis Roussos